Barbados competed at the 2022 Commonwealth Games at Birmingham, England from 28 July – 8 August 2022. It was their 17th appearance at the Commonwealth Games, and their first since becoming a republic on 30 November 2021.

On 15 July 2022, a team of 65 athletes (23 men and 42 women) competing in 12 sports was named.

Matthew Wright and Latonia Blackman were the country's flagbearers during the opening ceremony.

Medalists

Competitors
The following is the list of number of competitors participating at the Games per sport/discipline.

Athletics

A squad of nine athletes was officially announced on 15 July 2022.

Men
Track and road events

Field events

Women
Track and road events

Badminton

As of 1 June 2022, Barbados qualified for the mixed team event via the BWF World Rankings. Four players were officially announced on 15 July 2022.

Singles

Doubles

Mixed team

Summary

Squad

Kennie King
Shae Martin
Tamisha Williams
Sabrina Scott

Group stage

Boxing

A squad of three boxers was officially announced on 15 July 2022.

Cricket

By virtue of their position in the ICC Women's T20I rankings (as of 1 April 2021), the West Indies qualified for the tournament; their status as a multinational Caribbean team meant the associated quota had to be awarded to one of the associated countries. Following the cancellation of the 2021 Twenty20 Blaze tournament (the intended qualifier), Cricket West Indies declared the quota would go to Barbados, the reigning Twenty20 Blaze champions from 2018–19.

Fixtures were announced in November 2021.

Summary

Roster
Fifteen players were officially selected on 15 July 2022.

Hayley Matthews (c)
Aaliyah Alleyne
Shanika Bruce
Shai Carrington
Shaunte Carrington
Shamilia Connell
Deandra Dottin
Keila Elliott
Trishan Holder
Kycia Knight
Kyshona Knight
Alisa Scantlebury
Shakera Selman
Tiffany Thorpe
Aaliyah Williams

Group play

Cycling

A squad of two cyclists was officially announced on 15 July 2022.

Track
Sprint

Points race

Scratch race

Gymnastics

One gymnast was officially announced on 15 July 2022.

Artistic
Women
Individual Qualification

Judo

One judoka was officially announced on 15 July 2022.

Netball

By virtue of its position in the World Netball Rankings (as of 31 January 2022), Barbados qualified for the tournament.

Complete fixtures were announced in March 2022.

Summary

Roster
Twelve players were selected on 11 July 2022.

Latonia Blackman (co-c)
Shonette Azore-Bruce (co-c)
Faye Agard
Vanessa Bobb
Samantha Browne
Brianna Holder
Zakiya Kirton
Tonisha Rock-Yaw
Stephian Shepherd
Akeena Stoute
Sabreena Smith
Shonica Wharton

Group play

Eleventh place match

Squash

A squad of five players was officially announced on 15 July 2022.

Singles

Doubles

Swimming

A squad of five swimmers was officially announced on 15 July 2022.

Men

Women

Mixed

Table tennis

Barbados qualified a men's team for the table tennis competition. Four players were officially announced on 15 July 2022.

Singles

Doubles

Team

Triathlon

A squad of four triathletes was officially selected on 15 July 2022.

Individual

Mixed Relay

Notes

References

External links
Barbados Olympic Association Official site

Nations at the 2022 Commonwealth Games
Barbados at the Commonwealth Games
2022 in Barbadian sport